Jean-Pierre Goyer,  (January 17, 1932 – May 24, 2011) was a lawyer and Canadian Cabinet minister.

Goyer was born in Saint-Laurent, Quebec, the son of Gilbert and Marie-Ange Goyer. He graduated from the University of Montreal.

Goyer was first elected to the House of Commons of Canada as the Liberal Party of Canada Member of Parliament for Dollard in the 1965 election. He was re-elected in the 1968 election, and in 1970, was appointed to the Cabinet as Solicitor General of Canada by Prime Minister Pierre Trudeau. In this position, he oversaw the Royal Canadian Mounted Police in the aftermath of the FLQ Crisis.

Goyer as well as the McDonald Commission reviewed the practices of the Royal Canadian Mounted Police against the militant wing of the separatist movement and this led to the creation of a separate civilian security agency, the Canadian Security Intelligence Service, in the 1980s and intelligence responsibilities were removed from the federal police force.

Following the 1972 election, he became Minister of Supply and Services.

Goyer left Cabinet in November 1978 and announced that he would not run in the 1979 election. He returned to the practice of law in Montreal.

There is a Jean-Pierre Goyer fonds at Library and Archives Canada.

References

External links
 
 Trudeau's solicitor-general was the architect of prison reform Globe and Mail obituary

1932 births
2011 deaths
Liberal Party of Canada MPs
Members of the House of Commons of Canada from Quebec
People from Saint-Laurent, Quebec
Politicians from Montreal
Members of the King's Privy Council for Canada
October Crisis
Lawyers from Montreal
Canadian King's Counsel
Solicitors General of Canada